William C. McCracken (April 11, 1864 – June 13, 1940) was an American college football coach and educator. He served as the head football coach at Geneva College in Beaver Falls, Pennsylvania from 1890 to 1896 and Northern State Normal School—now known as Northern Michigan University–in Marquette, Michigan in 1904, compiling a career coaching record of 19–19–1. McCracken chaired the chemistry department at Western Michigan University—in Kalamazoo, Michigan for many years and served as the school's acting president in 1922–23.

Early life and education
Born in St. Louis, McCracken attended Columbia University, the University of Michigan, and the University of Chicago.

Coaching career

Geneva
McCracken was the first head football coach at Geneva College in Beaver Falls, Pennsylvania, serving for seven seasons, from 1890 to 1896, and compiling a record of 17–18–1. He also played on Geneva's teams of 1891, 1892, and 1894.

Northern Michigan
After starting the program at Geneva, McCracken went to the newly-formed Normal School of Northern Michigan—now known as now Northern Michigan University—in Marquette, Michigan to teach chemistry and physics. Records show that he was on staff at Normal as early as 1901.

In 1904, he was asked to start the program there, making the second school where he was the first coach. His team produced a record of 2–1 in the inaugural 1904 season and played their games at the County Fairgrounds.

Education career
In 1907, McCracken took a position as head of the chemistry department at Western State Normal School—now known as Western Michigan University—in Kalamazoo, Michigan. He remained at Western Michigan until his retirement in 1939, also serving as acting university president for the 1922–23 school year. He was the first faculty advisor for the Western Herald student newspaper in 1916.

Death and honors
McCracken died on June 13, 1940, at Borgess Hospital in Kalamazoo, following a two-week-long illness. In 1946, the school began plans for McCracken Hall to honor his legacy.

Head coaching record

References

External links
 

1864 births
1940 deaths
19th-century players of American football
American football guards
American football tackles
Geneva Golden Tornadoes football coaches
Geneva Golden Tornadoes football players
Northern Michigan Wildcats football coaches
Presidents of Western Michigan University
Western Michigan University faculty
Columbia University alumni
University of Chicago alumni
University of Michigan alumni
Players of American football from St. Louis